Henry Gilford Picard (November 28, 1906 – April 30, 1997) was an American professional golfer.

Born in Plymouth, Massachusetts, Picard learned to play golf while caddying at the Plymouth Country Club. Already a talented player by his early 20s, he came to prominence after coaching from the leading instructor Alex Morrison. A leading player on the PGA Tour in the 1930s and early 1940s, he won two major championships: the Masters in 1938 and the PGA Championship in 1939, where he defeated Byron Nelson on the 37th hole of the final. Picard ("Pick" to friends) played on both the 1935 and 1937 Ryder Cup teams, winning both singles matches and one of two pairs matches.

Picard helped a struggling Ben Hogan with his game in the late 1930s, advising him to weaken his grip, and Hogan combined this advice with his own hard work to become one of golf's all-time great players. When he left the sought-after pro's position at Hershey Country Club in early 1941, Picard recommended Hogan as his replacement, and he got the job. Hogan dedicated his first book, "Ben Hogan's Power Golf," to Picard in 1953.

Picard was pro at the Country Club of Charleston, Charleston, South Carolina, 1925–34; Hershey Country Club, Hershey, Pennsylvania, 1934–41; then moving to Twin Hills G & CC, Oklahoma City, Oklahoma, for two years, then returned to his South Carolina farm in early 1943.  Other professional positions include CC of Harrisburg, Harrisburg, Pennsylvania; Canterbury Golf Club, Cleveland, Ohio; and Seminole Golf Club, Palm Beach, Florida. Among his students was Jack Grout, who later taught Jack Nicklaus.

Picard retired from Seminole in 1973 and returned to Charleston and was named to the South Carolina athletic hall of fame in 1977. He was a fixture in the local golf community in his later years, and helped future LPGA hall of famer Beth Daniel in her teens. Picard played regularly into his 80s and died at age 90 in 1997. He was elected to the World Golf Hall of Fame in April 2006 and inducted in that October.

Professional wins

PGA Tour wins (26)
1932 (1) Mid-South Open (tie with Al Watrous and Al Houghton)
1934 (1) North and South Open
1935 (5) Agua Caliente Open, Tournament of the Gardens Open, Atlanta Open, Metropolitan Open, Inverness Invitational Four-Ball (with Johnny Revolta)
1936 (3) Tournament of the Gardens Open, North and South Open, Hershey Open
1937 (4) Tournament of the Gardens Open, Hershey Open, St. Augustine Pro-Amateur, Miami International Four-Ball (with Johnny Revolta)
1938 (2) Pasadena Open, Masters Tournament
1939 (6) New Orleans Open, Thomasville Open, Metropolitan Open, Anthracite Open, PGA Championship, Inverness Invitational Four-Ball (with Johnny Revolta)
1941 (2) New Orleans Open, Harlingen Open-Texas
1945 (1) Miami Open

Missing one win.

Major championships are shown in bold.

Other wins (9)
this list may be incomplete
1925 Carolinas Open
1926 Carolinas Open
1932 Carolinas Open
1933 Carolinas Open
1935 Miami International Four-Ball (with Johnny Revolta), Riverside Pro/Am
1936 Miami International Four-Ball (with Johnny Revolta)
1937 Argentine Open
1938 Mid South Pro/Pro (with Jack Grout; tie with Tommy Armour and Bobby Cruickshank)

Source:

Major championships

Wins (2)

Results timeline

NYF = tournament not yet founded
NT = no tournament
WD = withdrew
CUT = missed the half-way cut
R64, R32, R16, QF, SF = Round in which player lost in PGA Championship match play
"T" indicates a tie for a place

Summary

Most consecutive cuts made – 30 (1932 PGA – 1947 Masters)
Longest streak of top-10s – 5 (1937 PGA – 1939 Masters)

See also
List of golfers with most PGA Tour wins

References

Further reading

External links

PGA of America Hall of Fame

American people of French descent
American male golfers
PGA Tour golfers
Ryder Cup competitors for the United States
Winners of men's major golf championships
World Golf Hall of Fame inductees
Golfers from Massachusetts
Golfers from South Carolina
People from Plymouth, Massachusetts
Sportspeople from Plymouth County, Massachusetts
Sportspeople from Charleston, South Carolina
1906 births
1997 deaths